Maria Pańczyk-Pozdziej (10 January 1942 – 12 May 2022) was a Polish politician. A member of the Civic Platform, she served in the Senate of Poland from 2005 to 2019. She died on 12 May 2022 at the age of 80.

References

1942 births
2022 deaths
21st-century Polish women politicians
Polish radio journalists
Polish educators
Women members of the Senate of Poland
Members of the Senate of Poland 2005–2007
Members of the Senate of Poland 2007–2011
Members of the Senate of Poland 2011–2015
Members of the Senate of Poland 2015–2019
Civic Platform politicians
People from Tarnowskie Góry
Knights of the Order of Polonia Restituta